Spender is a British television police procedural drama, created by Ian La Frenais and Jimmy Nail, that first broadcast on 8 January 1991 on BBC1. The series, which also starred Nail as the titular character, ran for three series between 1991 and 1993, finishing with a feature-length special, The French Collection, broadcast on 29 December 1993. A total of twenty-one episodes were produced. The first and second series were produced by Martin McKeand, while the third and final series was produced by Paul Raphael and Peter McAleese.

The series, set in Newcastle upon Tyne, focuses on the life and exploits of Detective Sergeant Freddie Spender, who was often chosen to carry out more daring police cases. With his criminal sidekick Stick (Sammy Johnson), Spender was regarded as one of the more remarkable TV detectives of the 1990s. The series featured an extensive back story for the main characters, with a number of episodes dealing with Spender's domestic life, his family and circumstances. Some of the storylines were however seen as somewhat dark; one episode featured the death of Spender's wife at the hands of a ruthless gangster, another on the kidnap of one of his daughters.

Guest stars in the series included Amanda Redman, Rodney Bewes, Frances Tomelty, Julie Peasgood, Jan Graveson, Geoffrey Hughes, Bobby Pattinson, Tom Bell and Ian McElhinney. The series was broadcast on Tuesday evenings in the peak time slot that followed the BBC's flagship Nine O'Clock News. No further series were produced following the feature-length special, despite the popularity of the show, and it being a smash hit for the BBC in terms of ratings with the show regularly pulling in 14 million viewers, and each episode costing upwards of £350,000 to produce. In 1992, a novelisation of the series, written by Nail, was published. The series has never been released on DVD.

Development
Jimmy Nail initially mentioned the idea of a cop show to writer Ian La Frenais, with whom he'd worked on Auf Wiedersehen, Pet, in 1987. The BBC subsequently commissioned a pilot script, written by the latter, which was enthusiastically received; however La Frenais was too busy to work on further episodes. A producer suggested that Nail should try writing a script, which was also positively received by the BBC. Subsequently, a series of eight episodes was commissioned by the network. Not confident he could repeat the formula for remaining episodes in the series on his own, Nail moved to Los Angeles in 1989 to be closer to La Frenais as he worked on material for the series.

The second and third series were produced by Initial.

Ford provided a new Ford Sierra Sapphire RS Cosworth for each series, which served as Spender's car. Stick drove a Volkswagen Beetle. A number of Ford, Vauxhall, BMW and Range Rover cars were also featured in the series.

Cast
 Jimmy Nail as DS Freddie Spender
 Sammy Johnson as Kenneth Norman 'Stick' Oakley 
 Berwick Kaler as DS Dan Boyd 
 Denise Welch as Frances Spender
 Tony McAnaney as Keith Moreland 
 Lynn Harrisson as Kate Spender 
 Dawn Winlow as Laura Spender 
 Paul Greenwood as Supt. Yelland (Series 1)
 Peter Guinness as DCS Gillespie (Series 2–3)
 Brendan Healy as Eric (Series 2–3)
 Mickey Hutton as 'Spud' Tate (Series 2–3)

Episodes

Series 1 (1991)

Series 2 (1992)

Series 3 (1993)

References

External links

1991 British television series debuts
1993 British television series endings
1990s British drama television series
BBC television dramas
Fictional people from Newcastle upon Tyne
Television shows set in Northumberland
Television shows set in Tyne and Wear
Television shows set in Newcastle upon Tyne
Television series produced at Pinewood Studios
English-language television shows